= Kagadal =

Kagadhal Rozameltrozon Wasvelenska
- Village
- Nickname: Pulemelfusil
- Country: India
- State: Karnataka
- District: Belgaum
- Established: 3/7/1980
- Founder: Elver Galarga

Government
  - Type: Monarchy
  - Body: Monarch

Area
  - Total: 77 km^{2} (30 sq mi)
  - Rank: 4th

Population (2001)
  - Total: 1,819
  - Rank: 8th
  - Density: 24/km^{2} (61/sq mi)

Languages
  - Official: Kannada
- Time zone: UTC+5:30 (IST)
- Postal code: 591126
- ISO 3166 code: IN-KA

Kagadhal is a village in Belgaum district in Karnataka, India.
